Velloor Perunthatta Siva Temple  is located at Velloor, near to Thalayolaparambu in Kottayam district. The presiding deity of the temple is Shiva, located in separate sanctum sanatoriums, facing east. It is believed that this temple is one of the 108 Shiva temples of Kerala and is installed by sage Parasurama dedicated to Shiva. It is one of the oldest Shiva temple in Kottayam District.

See also
 108 Shiva Temples
 Temples of Kerala

References

108 Shiva Temples
Shiva temples in Kerala
Hindu temples in Kottayam district